Breitscheid may refer to:

Breitscheid, Hesse, a municipality in Hesse, Germany
Breitscheid, Mainz-Bingen, a municipality in the district Mainz-Bingen in Rhineland-Palatinate, Germany
Breitscheid (Westerwald), a municipality in the district Neuwied in Rhineland-Palatinate, Germany
Ratingen-Breitscheid, a borough of the city of Ratingen, Germany
the Breitscheid meteorite of 1956, which fell in Hesse, Germany (see Meteorite falls)

People with the surname
Rudolf Breitscheid (1874–1944), German politician

See also
 Breitscheidt, a municipality in the district Altenkirchen in Rhineland-Palatinate, Germany